The Duke of Reichstadt may refer to:

 The Duke of Reichstadt (1920 film), an Austrian silent film
 The Duke of Reichstadt (1931 film), a French-German historical drama film
 Duke of Reichstadt or Napoleon II